Serial ATA International Organization (SATA-IO) is an independent, non-profit organization which provides the computing industry with guidance and support for implementing the SATA specification. SATA-IO was developed by and for leading industry companies. It was officially formed in July 2004 by incorporating the previous Serial ATA Working Group which had been established in February 2000 to specify Serial ATA for desktop applications.

SATA-IO is affiliated directly to INCITS, and indirectly via INCITS to ANSI.  Many members form this organization; it is currently led by ATP Electronics, Dell, Hewlett-Packard, HGST, Intel, Marvell, PMC-Sierra, SanDisk, Seagate Technology, and Western Digital.

See also 
 SATA Express
 Serial ATA

External links 
 Official site
 Homepage of American Standards Institute
 Homepage of the ANSI accredited standardization body INCITS
 List of INCITS standards
 Technical Committee T13 (AT Attachment)

References 

 
Serial ATA